"Ain't Talkin' 'bout Love" is a song by American rock band Van Halen. It was released in October 1978 as the third single from their 1978 debut album, Van Halen.

This song is one of the few David Lee Roth-era songs that subsequent replacement Sammy Hagar was willing to sing in concert when he joined the band in the mid-1980s.

Guitar World readers ranked it the fifth-best metal riff of all time.

Background and writing
When Eddie Van Halen wrote the song, he did not consider it good enough to show his bandmates until a year later. He said it was supposed to be a punk rock parody, "a stupid thing to us, just two chords. It didn't end up sounding punk, but that was the intention." The guitar solo was doubled in overdubs with an electric sitar.

Legacy
The song has been described as "[laying] down the style and sentiment of what would become 80s hair metal". It has also been called their "most heavy metal track".

The opening riff was sampled in Apollo 440's 1997 song "Ain't Talkin' 'bout Dub".

Personnel
David Lee Roth – lead vocals
Eddie Van Halen – guitar, backing vocals, electric sitar
Michael Anthony – bass, backing vocals
Alex Van Halen – drums

References

1978 songs
Van Halen songs
Songs written by David Lee Roth
Songs written by Eddie Van Halen
Song recordings produced by Ted Templeman
Warner Records singles